Piguet is a surname. Notable people with the surname include:

 Amedée Piguet, Swiss wrestler
 Charles Piguet (1859–1918), Swiss tutor
 Gabriel Piguet (1887–1952), Roman Catholic bishop
 Robert Piguet (1898–1953), Swiss fashion designer

See also
 Audemars Piguet, company

French-language surnames